The grinning Izak or East African spotted Izak (Holohalaelurus grennian) is a type of catshark in the waters of the Western Indian Ocean, near Kenya.

References 

Holohalaelurus
Fish described in 2006